The Centre Democrats (DdC) was a social Christian political party in San Marino. Its Italian counterpart was The Daisy.

It emerged in 2007 as a left-wing split from the Sammarinese Christian Democratic Party. For the 2008 general election, the first elections the Centre Democrats have taken part in, the party was part of the Reforms and Freedom coalition, centred on the Party of Socialists and Democrats which won 25 seats out of 60 in the Grand and General Council gaining 45.78% of the national vote. The Centre Democrats itself gained 2 seats out of the 25 the coalition and 4.94% of the national vote.

On 4 March 2011, the party merged with Euro-Populars for San Marino to form the Union for the Republic.

References

Catholic political parties
Christian democratic parties in Europe
Defunct political parties in San Marino
Political parties established in 2007
Political parties disestablished in 2011
2007 establishments in San Marino
2011 disestablishments in San Marino